Here is the list of all ouvrages of the Maginot Line, organized by sector and type of fortification.  Ouvrage translates as "works" in English: published documents in both English and French refer to these fortifications  in this manner, rather than as "forts". An ouvrage typically consists of a series of concrete-encased strongpoints, linked by tunnels.

For a list of the ouvrages of the Alpine Line, or Little Maginot Line, see List of Alpine Line ouvrages.

Belgian border

Fortified Sector of Flanders

Fortified Sector of Lille

Fortified Sector of the Escaut

Ouvrage
 Ouvrage d'Eth

Casemates
 Casemate de Tallandier 
 Casemate de Jeanlain  
 Casemate de Notre Dame d'Amour 
 Casemate du Mont des Bruyères 
 Casemate de la Ferme des Rosières 
 Casemate de Marlières 
 Casemate de Haute Rive 
 Casemate de Drève St Antoine 
 Casemate de Lièvre Ouest 
 Casemate de Lièvre Est 
 Casemate de Trieux d'Escaupont Ouest
 Casemate de Trieux d'Escaupont Est
 Casemate du Cimetière d'Escaupont Ouest
 Casemate du Cimetière d'Escaupont Est

Fortified Sector of Maubeuge

Ouvrages

 Ouvrage des Sarts 
 Ouvrage de Bersillies 
 Ouvrage de la Salmagne 
 Ouvrage de Boussois

Casemates
 Casemate de Héronfontaine
 Casemate de Crèvecoeur
 Casemate d'Epinette 
 Casemate de Rocq 
 Casemate de Marpent Nord 
 Casemate de Marpent Sud 
 Casemate d'Ostergnies 
 Casemate de Gommegnies Ouest 
 Casemate de Gommegnies Est
 Casemate du Cheval Blanc
 Casemate de Tréchon
 Casemate de Clare
 Casemate d'Obies
 Casemate de Bonwez 
 Casemate du Vivier Nuthiau Ouest 
 Casemate du Vivier Nuthiau Est 
 Casemate de la Haute Rue
 Casemate de la Porquerie Ouest
 Casemate de la Porquerie Est
 Casemate d'Hurtebise

Defensive sector of Ardennes

Fortified Sector of Montmédy

Ouvrages
 Ouvrage La Ferté
 Ouvrage Chesnois
 Ouvrage Thonnelle
 Ouvrage Velosnes

Casemates
 Casemate de Margut
 Casemate de Moiry
 Casemate de Sainte-Marie
 Casemate de Sapogne
 Casemate de Christ
 Casemate de Thonne-le-Thil
 Casemate de Guerlette
 Casemate d'Avioth
 Casemate de Fresnois
 Casemate de Saint-Antoine
 Casemate d'Ecouviez Ouest
 Casemate d'Ecouviez Est

Fortified Region of Metz

Fortified Sector of the Crusnes

Ouvrages
 Ouvrage Ferme Chappy (PO)
 Ouvrage Fermont (GO)
 Ouvrage Latiremont (GO)
 Ouvrage Mauvais-Bois (PO)
 Ouvrage Bois-du-Four (PO)
 Ouvrage Bréhain(GO)
 Ouvrage Aumetz (PO)

Casemates
 Casemate de Puxieux 
 Casemate du Bois-de-Beuveille 
 Casemate du Haut-de-l'Anguille Ouest 
 Casemate du Haut-de-l'Anguille Est 
 Casemate du Bois-de-Tappe Ouest 
 Casemate du Bois-de-Tappe Est 
 Casemate de l'Ermitage St Quentin 
 Casemate de Praucourt
 Casemate de Jalaumont Ouest 
 Casemate de Jalaumont Est 
 Casemate de Chénières Ouest 
 Casemate de Chénières Est 
 Casemate de Laix 
 Casemate de Morfontaine 
 Casemate de Villers la Montagne Ouest 
 Casemate de Villers la Montagne Centre 
 Casemate de Villers la Montagne Est 
 Casemate de Verbusch Ouest 
 Casemate de Verbusch Est 
 Casemate de la Ferme Thiery 
 Casemate de Bourène Ouest 
 Casemate de Bourène Est 
 Casemate Ouest de Bréhain 
 Casemate du Ravin de Crusnes 
 Casemate de Crusnes Ouest 
 Casemate de Crusnes Est 
 Casemate du Nouveau Crusnes Ouest 
 Casemate du Nouveau Crusnes Est 
 Casemate du Réservoir 
 Casemate de la Route d'Ottange Ouest 
 Casemate de la Route d'Ottange Centre 
 Casemate de la Route d'Ottange Est 
 Casemate de Tressange 
 Casemate de Bure
 Casemate du Fond d'Havange
 Casemate du Gros Bois

Shelters
 Abri du Gros Bois

Observatories
 Observatoire de Puxieux 
 Observatiore de l'Haut-de-l'Anguille 
 Observatoire du Haut-de-la-Vigne 
 Observatoire de la Ferme du Bois du Four 
 Observatoire du Réservoir

Safety camps
 Camp de Doncourt
 Camp de Morfontaine
 Camp d'Errouville
 Camp de Ludelange

Fortified Sector of Thionville

Ouvrages
 Ouvrage Rochonvillers (GO)
 Ouvrage Molvange (GO)
 Ouvrage Soetrich (GO)
 Ouvrage Kobenbusch (GO)
 Ouvrage Galgenberg (GO)
 Ouvrage Métrich (GO)
 Ouvrage Billig (GO)
 Ouvrage Immerhof (PO)
 Ouvrage Bois Karre (PO)
 Ouvrage Oberheid (PO)
 Ouvrage Sentzich (PO)

Casemates
 Casemate du Grand Lot
 Casemate d'Escherange Ouest
 Casemate d'Escherange Est
 Casemate du Petersberg Ouest
 Casemate du Petersberg Est
 Casemate d'Entrange
 Casemate du Bois de Kanfen Ouest
 Casemate du Bois de Kanfen Est
 Casemate de Boust
 Casemate de Basse-Parthe Ouest
 Casemate de Basse-Parthe Est
 Casemate du Sonnenberg
 Casemate de Koenigsmacker Nord
 Casemate de Koenigsmacker Sud
 Casemate de Métrich Nord
 Casemate de Métrich Sud
 Casemate du Bois de Koenigsmacker

Shelters
 Abri du Grand Lot (caverne)
 Abri du Bois d'Escherange (caverne)
 Abri du Petersberg (caverne)
 Abri du Zeiterholz (surface)
 Abri du Bois de Kanfen (surface)
 Abri du Stressling (surface)
 Abri d'Hettange-Grande (surface)
 Abri de la Route de Luxembourg (surface)
 Abri de l'Helmreich (caverne)
 Abri du Barrungshof (surface)
 Abri du Bois Karre (surface)
 Abri du Rippert (surface)
 Abri du Bois de Cattenom (surface)
 Abri du Krekelbusch (caverne)
 Abri de Métrich (caverne)
 Abri du Nonnenberg (caverne)
 Abri du Bichel Nord (surface) 
 Abri du Bichel Sud (surface)

Observatories
 Observatoire de Hettange-Grande
 Observatoire de la Route de Luxembourg
 Observatoire de Boust
 Observatoire de Cattenom

Safety camps
 Camp d'Angevillers
 Camp d'Hettange-Grande
 Camp de Cattenom
 Camp d'Elzange

Old German forts
 Fort d'Illange
 Fort de Guentrange
 Fort de Koenigsmacker

Fortified Sector of Boulay

Ouvrages

 Ouvrage Hackenberg (GO)
 Ouvrage Mont des Welches (GO)
 Ouvrage Michelsberg (GO)
 Ouvrage Anzeling (GO)
 Ouvrage Coucou (PO)
 Ouvrage Hobling (PO)
 Ouvrage Bousse (PO)
 Ouvrage Berenbach (PO)
 Ouvrage Bovenberg (PO)
 Ouvrage Denting (PO)
 Ouvrage Village de Coume (PO)
 Ouvrage Annexe Nord de Coume (PO)
 Ouvrage Coume (PO)
 Ouvrage Annexe Sud de Coume (PO)
 Ouvrage Mottemberg (PO)

Casemates
 Casemate du Bovenberg 
 Casemate du Bois d'Ottonville 
 Casemate du Hummersberg Nord  
 Casemate du Hummersberg Sud
 Casemate de Veckring Nord  
 Casemate de Veckring Sud  
 Casemate de Menskirch  
 Casemate du Huberbusch Ouest  
 Casemate du Huberbusch Est  
 Casemate d'Edling Ouest  
 Casemate d'Edling Est  
 Casemate d'Eblange  
 Casemate de Langhep Ouest  
 Casemate de Langhep Est  
 Casemate du Bisterberg Nord I  
 Casemate du Bisterberg Nord II 
 Casemate du Bisterberg Sud III  
 Casemate du Bisterberg Sud IIII  
 Casemate sud du Mottemberg

Observatories
 Observatoire des Chênes Brulés 
 Observatoire de Hestroff

Shelters
 Abri du Hummersberg (caverne)
 Abri de Veckring (caverne)
 Abri du Coucou (surface)
 Abri des Chênes Brulés (caverne)
 Abri de Klang (caverne)
 Abri du Mont des Welches (surface)
 Abri d'Ising (surface)
 Abri de Bilmette (surface)
 Abri de Férange (caverne)
 Abri de Hestroff (surface)
 Abri du Rotherberg (caverne)
 Abri de Bockange (surface)
 Abri de Gomelange (surface)
 Abri de Colming (abri-casemate de surface)

Fortified Sector of Faulquemont

Ouvrages
 Ouvrage Kerfent (PO)
 Ouvrage Bambesch (PO)
 Ouvrage Einseling (PO)
 Ouvrage Laudrefang (PO)
 Ouvrage Téting (PO)

Casemates
 Casemate du Bambesch
 Casemate de Stocken
 Casemate de Téting
 Casemate de Bambiderstroff Nord
 Casemate de Bambiderstroff Sud
 Casemate de l'Einseling Nord
 Casemate de l'Einseling Sud
 Casemate des Quatre-Vents Nord
 Casemate des Quatre-Vents Sud
 Casemate du Bois de Laudrefang Nord
 Casemate du Bois de Laudrefang Sud

Fortified Region of the Sarre

Fortified Sector of the Sarre

Ouvrages
 Ouvrage Haut-Poirier

Casemates
 Casemate de Wittring
 Casemate du Grand-Bois
 Casemate du Nord-Ouest d'Achen
 Casemate du Nord d'Achen
 Casemate du Nord-Est d'Achen

Fortified Region of the Lauter

Fortified Sector of Rohrbach

Gros ouvrages
 Ouvrage Simserhof
 Ouvrage Schiesseck

Petits Ouvrages
 Ouvrage Welschof
 Ouvrage Rohrbach
 Ouvrage Otterbiel

Casemates
 Casemate Ouest de Singling
 Casemate Nord-Ouest de Singling Gauche
 Casemate Nord-Ouest de Singling Droite
 Casemate de Bining
 Casemate de la Station-de-Rohrbach
 Casemate de Rohrbach
 Casemate du Sinnerberg Ouest
 Casemate du Sinnerberg Est
 Casemate du Petit-Réderching Ouest
 Casemate du Petit-Réderching Est
 Casemate du Petit-Réderching
 Casemate du Seelberg Ouest
 Casemate du Seelberg Est
 Casemate du Judenhoff
 Casemate de Hohlbach
 Casemate du Légeret
 Casemate du Freudenberg
 Casemate de Ramstein Ouest
 Casemate de Ramstein Est
 Casemate du Champ d'Aviation Ouest
 Casemate du Champ d'Aviation Est
 Casemate du Kindelberg
 Casemate de Rochat Ouest
 Casemate de Rochat Est
 Casemate du Petit-Hohékirkel
 Casemate du Grand-Hohékirkel Ouest
 Casemate du Grand-Hohékirkel Est

Shelters
 Abri de Frohmuhle (caverne)
 Abri du Légeret (caverne)
 Abri du Freudenberg (caverne)
 Abri de Reyerswiller (caverne)
 Abri du Camp (surface)

Observatories
 Observatoire du Freudenberg

Fortified Sector of the Vosges

Ouvrages
 Grand-Hohèkirkel
 Four-à-Chaux
 Ouvrage Lembach

Casemates
 Casemate du Biesenberg (artillerie)
 Casemate de Windstein (artillerie)
 Casemate de la Main-du-Prince Ouest
 Casemate de la Main-du-Prince Est
 Casemate du Biesenberg (infanterie)
 Casemate de Glasbronn
 Casemate d'Altzinsel
 Casemate de Rothenburg
 Casemate du Nonnenkopf
 Casemate du Grafenweiher Nord-Ouest
 Casemate du Grafenweiher Centre
 Casemate du Grafenweiher Est
 Casemate de Dambach Nord
 Casemate de Dambach Sud
 Casemate du Wineckerthal Ouest
 Casemate du Wineckerthal Est
 Casemate du Grunenthal
 Casemate de Windstein (infanterie)
 Casemate de La Verrerie
 Casemate de Lembach
 Casemate de Schmelzbach Ouest

Shelters
 Abri du Dépôt
 Abri de Wolfschachen

Fortified Sector of Haguenau

Ouvrages
 Ouvrage Hochwald
 Ouvrage Schoenenbourg

Casemates
 Casemate de Sschmeltzbach Est
 Casemate de Walkmuhl
 Casemate de Drachenbronn Nord
 Casemate de Drachenbronn Sud
 Casemate de Bremmelbach Nord
 Casemate de Bremmelbach Sud
 Casemate de Breitenacker Nord
 Casemate de Breitenacker Sud
 Casemate d'Ingolsheim Ouest
 Casemate d'Ingolsheim Est
 Casemate d'Hunspach-Village
 Casemate d'Hunspach-Station
 Casemate du Moulin d'Hunspach Ouest
 Casemate du Moulin d'Hunspach Est
 Casemate de Buchholzberg
 Casemate d'Hoffen Ouest
 Casemate d'Hoffen Est
 Casemate du Bois de Hoffen
 Casemate d'Aschbach Ouest
 Casemate d'Aschbach Est
 Casemate d'Oberroedern Nord
 Casemate d'Oberroedern Sud
 Casemate de La Seltz
 Casemate de Hatten Nord
 Casemate de Hatten Sud
 Casemate d'Esch
 Casemate du Bois de Rittershoffen 1
 Casemate du Bois de Rittershoffen 2
 Casemate du Bois de Rittershoffen 3
 Casemate du Bois de Rittershoffen 4
 Casemate du Bois de Rittershoffen 5
 Casemate du Bois de Rittershoffen 6
 Casemate du Bois de Koenigsbruck Nord
 Casemate du Bois de Koenigsbruck Sud
 Casemate de Kauffenheim
 casemate du Heidenbuckel
 Casemate de Rountzenheim Nord
 Casemate de Rountzenheim Sud
 Casemate d'Auenheim Nord
 Casemate d'Auenheim Sud
 Casemate du Pont-de-Seltz
 Casemate du Pont-de-Roppenheim Nord
 Casemate du Pont-de-Roppenheim Sud
 Casemate de Neuhaeuseul
 Casemate de Fort-Louis-Village
 Casemate de Fort-Louis-Ouest
 Casemate de Fort-Louis-Est

Shelters
 Abri du Birlenbach
 Abri du Grassersloch
 Abri de Schoenenbourg
 Abri du Buchholzerberg
 Abri de Hoffen
 Abri de Hatten
 Abri de la Sauer
 Abri de Koenigsbruck
 Abri de la Donau
 Abri du Heidenbuckel
 Abri de Soufflenheim
 Abri de Beinheim Nord
 Abri de Beinheim Sud
 Abri de Stattmatten

Observatories
 Observatoire d'Hunspach
 Observatoire de Hatten
 Observatoire du Hochwald
 Observatoire du Buchholzberg

Rhine border

Fortified Sector of the Lower Rhine

Fortified Sector of Colmar

Fortified Sector of Mulhouse

Fortified region of Belfort

Fortified Sector of Altkirch

Fortified Sector of Montbéliard

Fortified Sector of the Jura

Defensive Sector of the Rhône

References

Internet
 La Ligne Maginot {fr}
 La Ligne Maginot en Lorraine {fr}
 Cartomaginot.com - Cartographie de la ligne Maginot {fr}
 Wikimaginot.eu - Informations, coordonnées, documents et photos sur les élements du systéme fortifié Maginot {fr}

Bibliography
 Halter, Marc; History of the Maginot Line, Strasbourg, Moselle River, 2011. 
 La Ligne Maginot, Tome 3 de  Jean-Yves Mary, Alain Hohnadel, Jacques Sicard  {fr} 

Maginot Line